KapCon is a role-playing convention held annually in Wellington, New Zealand.  It is one of the largest gaming conventions in New Zealand, and the longest running, having run every Wellington Anniversary Weekend (the weekend closest to 22 January) since 1993.  The con is small by international standards, attracting around a hundred and fifty people. The 2012 convention ran from 21–22 January 2012.

KapCon was originally an abbreviation of "Kapiti Convention", and was held in Paraparaumu, an exurb of Wellington.  In 1995 it moved to Wellington, repeatedly changing venues to deal with growth until finally finding a stable venue at Wellington High School in 2003.

The convention focuses on tabletop roleplaying, such as Call of Cthulhu and Dungeons & Dragons, with a strong strand of systemless and "indie" gaming. Since 2001 it has also hosted regular Live action role-playing games and an annual Scenario Design Competition. It does not have guests of honour.

In 1995 FSpace Publications debuted their FSpaceRPG at KapCon.

List of conventions
 1993 KapCon '93 (Coastlands, Paraparaumu)
 1994 KapCon '94 (Coastlands, Paraparaumu)
 1995 KapCon '95 (Museum Hotel)
 1996 KapCon '96 (Museum Hotel)
 1997 KapCon '97 (Just On Willis Motel)
 1998 KapCon '98 (Victoria University)
 1999 KapCon '99 (Wellington Netball Clubrooms)
 2000 KapCon IX (Turnbull House)
 2001 KapCon X (Northland Community Hall)
 2002 KapCon XI: The Eleventh Hour (Northland Community Hall)
 2003 KapCon XII: The Twelfth Night (Wellington High School)
 2004 KapCon XIII: I Know What You Roleplayed Last Summer (Wellington High School)
 2005 KapCon XIV: The Big 10-4 (Wellington High School)
 2006 KapCon XV: Rule Britannia (Wellington High School)
 2007 KapCon XVI: Flight of the Hindenburg (Wellington High School)
 2008 KapCon XVII: Random Encounters (Wellington High School)
 2009 KapCon XVIII: Suitable For General Audiences (Wellington High School)
 2010 KapCon XIX: N-n-n-n-n-Nineteen (Wellington High School) 
 2011 KapCon XX: Unnatural 20 (Wellington High School)
 2012 KapCon XXI: Achaean (Wellington High School)
 2013 KapCon XXII: Fragrant Harbour (Wellington High School)
 2014 KapCon XXIII (Wellington High School)
 2015 KapCon XXIV (Wellington High School)
 2016 KapCon XXV (Wellington High School)
 2017 KapCon XXVI (Wellington High School)
 2018 KapCon XXVII (Wellington High School)
 2019 KapCon XXVIII (Wellington High School)
 2020 KapCon 2020 (Wellington High School)
 2021 KapCon 2021 (Wellington High School)

The change to Roman numerals in 2000 led to an error in numbering which has since been perpetuated.

References

External links
 Official site
 Scenario Design Competition entries
 Con stats

Gaming conventions
Role-playing conventions
Fairs in New Zealand
1993 establishments in New Zealand
Recurring events established in 1993
Annual events in New Zealand
Festivals in Wellington
Winter events in New Zealand
Conventions in New Zealand